Charley Ferrer (born April 1963, in Puerto Rico) became the first Latina Doctor of Human Sexuality in the United States in 2000 after receiving her doctoral degree from the Institute for Advanced Study of Human Sexuality. She is a clinical sexologist and award-winning author of several books on sexual health, self-empowerment, and breast cancer. A pioneer in the field of sexual health and empowerment, Dr. Ferrer began her journey providing workshops on sexual health and empowerment to women in Evergreen State College and across the Pacific Northwest. Her first book, The W.I.S.E. Journal for the Sensual Woman became an international success and lead to her invitation to lecture throughout the US and Latin America; where she taught medical providers and mental health practitioners the value of respecting their patients’ sexual orientations and preferences to enable physicians to provide the best care possible. 

Since receiving her Masters in Counseling Psychology from Saint Martin's University in 1996 and her Doctorate in Human Sexuality in 2000, Dr. Ferrer has made it her mission to educate the medical community, as well as, men and women on a healthier perspective of sexual health, sexual orientation, and sexual identity.  Dr. Ferrer worked with various organizations providing mental health and therapeutic assistance to those affected and infected by HIV; as well as, educating individuals on how to incorporate safe sexual practices into their lifestyle to decrease the risk of infection.  Dr. Charley was among those who helped pave the way for this discriminated population to have a voice and empower themselves. 

In 2005, Dr. Charley Ferrer spoke before the World Association of Sexual Health providing education an on another group of men and women who were discriminated against due to their sexual practices and self-identity; this being the dominance and submissive lifestyle, better known as the BDSM Community. (BDSM stands for Bondage, Discipline, Sadomasochism). Her educational platform provided a greater understanding to the medical community on the practices of this alternative lifestyle who faced discrimination so great that they were at risk of losing their children, their financial stability, even their family support and acceptance.  

Her pioneering lectures were a call to action for the medical and mental health practitioners to educate themselves on sexual orientation, preferences, and lifestyles to enable them to provide treatment without prejudice. Her controversial lectures and call to action prompted much discussion with attendees at the World Association of Sexual Health Congress. During that event, she was invited to lecture before the XIII CONGRESO VENEZOLANO DE SEXOLOGÍA in Venezuela in 2005, and again in 2008.  Her dedication to the sexual empowerment of men and women facilitated a collaboration between her and medical providers from Venezuela and Argentina to establish the Institute of Pleasure (Instituto de Placer). 

Dr. Ferrer has also worked for over a decade providing sexual behavioral education to individuals with developmental delays within the OMRDD community of New York City.    

In the summer of 2010, the State of Falcon in Venezuela invited Dr. Ferrer to join a group of respected physicians and sexologists from across Latin America to tour throughout the state of Falcon and provide sexual health education to the populace there. She was the only American Latina Sexologist to be invited. For three days, her group drove out of the capital of Falcon to the outskirts of the state, sometimes driving for three hours to reach their destination--a small town--where they conducted interactive discussions on sexual health and STD/STI risk reduction, and self-empowerment.  

Dr. Ferrer’s innovative approach to sexual health and acceptance of alternative sexual lifestyles prompted numerous invitations to lecture throughout the US and Latin America. In March 2013, she was invited to speak before the Chinese Sexology Association in China. Dr. Ferrer was among a handful of representatives from the Institute of Advanced Studies of Human Sexuality (IASHS) and sexologists around the globe to exchange ideas on sexual health and reform before the Chinese Sexology Association in Guangzhou and Hangzhou, China. An excerpt of her lecture, and those of other presenters, was published in the book, Yin Rising: The Chinese Sexual Evolution. This monumental conference opened the door to collaboration on sexual health between the US and China’s sexologist and health practitioners in association with IASHS. Dr. Ferrer returned to China in 2014 to conduct further educational lectures. 

Over the past two decades, Dr. Charley Ferrer has taught psychology and human sexuality courses as well as lectured on self-empowerment and breast cancer at various colleges and universities. Below are just a few of the colleges and Universities she’s taught or lectured at: Rutgers University, Centralia Community College, Evergreen State College, Tacoma Community College, Brandis University.  

Dr. Charley Ferrer leverages her expertise and her notoriety to bring professionalism and respect to a world of sexuality and alternative lifestyle which faced blatant discrimination and established workshops and educational programs to education medical providers and mental health practitioners concerning the lifestyle of dominance and submission; better known as the BDSM community. Since 1996, Dr. Ferrer has lectured and provided education on this community. In the summer of 2012, Dr. Ferrer established BDSM Writers Con, a three-day conference which provides accurate education on BDSM to authors and readers of this genre/lifestyle. It’s her hope that BDSM Writers Con will help reduce the discrimination faced by men and women who embrace this lifestyle. It wasn’t until the book, 50 Shades of Grey by E.L. James that BDSM became a popular discussion topic and the world began to loosening its deeply held prejudices toward the men and women who embrace this alternative lifestyle. Though dominance and submission is still a taboo lifestyle, some strides have been made to lessen the prejudices faced by this community. Currently, BDSM Writers Con is the only conference in the world dedicated to educating authors and readers on dominance and submission.

Dr. Ferrer’s passion for education goes far beyond classrooms, workshops, and books.  She’s been sourced in hundreds of articles throughout the world for her expertise in sexual health and her innovative pioneering educational outlook on sexual health and self-empowerment. In 2006, Dr. Charley Ferrer was recognized as one of the "Groundbreaking Latina Leaders” for her work in the field of Sexology and Sexual Health by the National Association for Latina Leaders in the US. And she’s been featured in the NY Post, NY Times, Cosmo, and Latin Magazine just to name a few. 
	
Dr. Charley Ferrer dedication to advocating for the underdog and bringing sexual health and empowerment to the world has taken many turns and paths and she herself face numerous obstacles and discrimination for her adamant defense of sexual freedom in all its forms. 

In February 2016, when she was diagnosed with breast cancer, she came face to face with a new form of discrimination which was so invasive and subtle that it has gone unnoticed or perhaps purposely overlooked for almost half a century. Dr. Ferrer witnessed and personally experienced the apathy and misogyny associated with breast cancer.  Her anger at the behavior of many of the medical professionals she observed or interacted with lead to her establishing Cancer Tamer—a new voice in the struggle with cancer.  Cancer Tamer is based on the philosophy that, “you should not be at war with your body!” Cancer Tamer provides education on ways to cope with the challenges women and their loved-one’s face while dealing with the complexities of breast cancer. Her book, Breast Cancer: From Diagnosis to Surgery provides valuable information to assist an individual in preparing for the road ahead, physically, mentally, and financially. Her popular television show providing information on cancer can be seen on YouTube and on the Cancer Tamer website. 

Surprised by the lack of attention and the reluctance of physicians to discuss sex and sexual dysfunction directly caused by treatments received and medications prescribed to cancer patients, Dr. Ferrer has combined her expertise in sexuality and her personal experience with breast cancer in her upcoming book, Sex AFTER Cancer.  Dr. Charley’s objective to provide women with ways to reclaim their sensual identity after breast and ovarian cancer, as well as other forms of this disease, can be seen in her Body Love Retreats. Thus, continuing her dedication to bring sexual and sensual health to all.  

Check below for a list of books written by Dr. Charley Ferrer.

Books
Breast Cancer: From Diagnosis to Surgery
Yin Rising: The Chinese Sexual Evolution
BDSM The Naked Truth
BDSM Writers Con Anthology 2016
BDSM Writers Con Anthology 2015 
Domme Says
BDSM Intensive   
Sex Unlimited
BDSM for Writers  
The Latina Kama Sutra—Nominated for Best Sexuality Book 2006/2007
The W.I.S.E. Journal for the Sensual Woman—Awarded Best Self-Help Book 2002
The Passionate Latina: In Our Own Words
Sex Con Sabor Latina (A play)
La Latina Kama Sutra: El Guía  Absoluto Para Citas, Sexo, y Placeres Eróticos
Para La Mujer Sensual – Best Self-Help Book 2002
First Annual BDSM Writers Con Anthology

References

https://www.theguardian.com/lifeandstyle/2015/feb/10/fetish-lovers-fifty-shades-of-grey-stonewall-moment
http://www.BDSMWritersCon.com
http://www.instituteofpleasure.org 
http://mobile.nytimes.com/2013/02/28/fashion/bondage-domination-and-kink-sex-communities-step-into-view.html
http://www.cosmopolitan.com/sex-love/advice/g2564/bondage/?slide=1

Puerto Rican academics
1963 births
Living people
Place of birth missing (living people)
Saint Martin's University alumni